The Provincial Councils of Baltimore were councils of Roman Catholic bishops that set the pattern for Catholic organisation in the United States of America. They were seen as having a unique importance for the Church in the United States, inasmuch as the earlier ones legislated for practically the whole territory of the Republic, and furnished moreover a norm for all the later Plenary Councils of Baltimore covering the whole country. This article touches upon only those parts of the canonical legislation which may seem in any way to individualize the discipline of the Church in the United States or depict the peculiar needs and difficulties of its nascent period.

Individual Provincial Councils

First Provincial Council
The First Provincial Council was held in 1829 and was attended by the archbishop and four bishops. Its decrees refer to the enactments of two previous conventions. Bishop John Carroll's Diocesan Synod of 1791 decreed: (No. 3) The ceremonies of baptism need not be supplied for converted heretics who had been previously validly baptized. (No. 4) As a rule children may not receive Confirmation before the age of reason. (No. 5) The offerings of the faithful are to be divided into three parts: for the support of the pastor, the relief of the poor and the sustentation of the church. (No. 11) The faithful are to be warned that the absolution of priests not approved by the bishop is invalid. 

(No. 15) None are to be married until they know the Christian Doctrine. Slaves need know only the principal truths, if more cannot be acquired. (No. 16) In mixed marriages the non-Catholic must promise before witnesses to bring up the offspring of the union as Catholics. (No. 17) Hymns and prayers in the vernacular (viz. English, not Latin) are to be encouraged at evening services. (No. 20) Catholics may work on days of obligation owing to the circumstances of place, but they must hear Mass if possible. (No. 23) The rich are to be warned that they sin grievously if, through their parsimony, pastors cannot be sustained and multiplied. (No. 24) When there is question of refusing Christian burial, the bishop must be consulted beforehand when possible.

The second series of enactments of the First Council referred to are the articles concerning ecclesiastical discipline sanctioned by the common consent of the Archbishop of Baltimore and the other American bishops in 1810. The main articles are: (No. 2) Regulars should not be withdrawn from pastoral work without the consent of the bishops, if their assistance be deemed a necessity to the existence or prosperity of their missions. (No. 3) The Douay version of the Bible is to be used. (No. 5) Baptism must be conferred in the church where possible. (No. 6) If no sponsor can be obtained, private baptism only is to be administered. (No. 9) The faithful are to be warned against improper theatres, dances and novels. (No. 10) Freemasons cannot be admitted to the sacraments.
 
Besides ordering the publication of these decrees along with their own synodical enactments, the fathers of the First Provincial Council decreed: (No. 1) Priests should labour in any mission assigned to them by the bishops. (No. 5) Owing to the abuses of lay trustees all future churches should be consigned to the bishop when possible. (No. 6) Trustees cannot institute or dismiss a pastor. No ecclesiastical patronage exists in this country. (No. 10) Infants of non-Catholics may be baptized if their parents promise to give them a Catholic education, but the sponsor must be a Catholic. (No. 20) In administering the sacraments and in the burial service, Latin and not English must be employed. (No. 31) A ceremonial written in English is to be drawn up. (No. 34) Catholic schools should be erected. 

At one of the sessions of this council several lawyers (among them Roger B. Taney, afterwards Chief Justice of the Supreme Court of the United States) gave advice to the bishops on points of American law concerning property rights and ecclesiastical courts. In addition to their decrees, the bishops asked and obtained from Rome permission to use for adults the formula of infant baptism; to consecrate baptismal water with the form approved for the missionaries of Peru and to extend the time for fulfilling the paschal precept, i.e. from the first Sunday of Lent to Trinity Sunday.

Second Provincial Council
The Second Council, held in 1833, was attended by the archbishop and nine bishops. The main decrees were: (No. 3) A delimitation of the American dioceses. (No. 4) A method of selecting bishops, which a later Council (Prov. VII) modified. (No. 5) Recommending the entrusting to the Jesuits of the Indian missions in the West, as also (No. 6) the missions among former American slaves, repatriated in Liberia, West Africa, to the same fathers. (No. 8) Bishops are exhorted to erect ecclesiastical seminaries.

Third Provincial Council
The Third Council in 1837 was composed of the archbishop and eight bishops. Its decrees enacted: (No. 4) Ecclesiastical property is to be secured by the best means the civil law affords. (No. 6) Ecclesiastics should not bring ecclesiastical cases before the civil tribunals. (No. 7) Priests are prohibited from soliciting money outside their own parishes. (No. 8) Pastors are warned against permitting unsuitable music at Divine worship. (No. 9) The two days following Easter and Pentecost are to be days of obligation no longer. (No. 10) Wednesdays in Advent are not to be days of fast and abstinence.

Fourth Provincial Council
The Fourth Council in 1840 issued decrees signed by the archbishop and twelve bishops as follows: (No. 1) In mixed marriages no sacred rites or vestments are to be used. (No. 5) Temperance societies are recommended to the faithful. (No. 6) Pastors are to see that those frequenting public school do not use the Protestant version of the Bible or sing sectarian hymns and to employ their influence against the introduction of such practices into the public schools. 

(No. 8) Bishops are to control ecclesiastical property and not permit priests to hold it in their own name. Among those attending this council was Charles Auguste Marie Joseph, Count of Forbin-Janson, the exiled Bishop of Nancy and Toul, France, to whom the fathers granted a right to a decisive vote. A letter of consolation was sent by the council to the persecuted bishops of Poland, and another of thanks to the moderators of the Leopold Institute of Vienna, Austria.

Fifth Provincial Council
In 1843, the Fifth Council was attended by the archbishop and sixteen bishops. Among its enactments were: (No. 2) Laymen may not deliver orations in churches. (No. 4) It is not expedient that the Tridentine decrees concerning clandestine matrimony be extended to places where they have not been already promulgated. (No. 5) Pastors must observe the law of residence. (No. 6) Priests may not borrow money for church uses without written permission of the bishop.

Sixth Provincial Council
The Sixth Council (the archbishop and twenty-two bishops attending) in 1846, decreed: (No. 1) that the Blessed Virgin Mary conceived without sin is chosen as the patron saint of the United States. (No. 2) Priests ordained titulo missionis may not enter a religious order without permission of their ordinaries. (No. 3) The canons concerning the proclaiming of the banns of matrimony are to be observed. At the request of the fathers, the Holy See sanctioned a formula to be used by the bishops in taking the oath at their consecration.

Seventh Provincial Council
In 1849 two archbishops and twenty-three bishops held the Seventh Council. The main decrees were: (No. 2) The Holy See is to be informed that the fathers think it opportune to define as a dogma the Immaculate Conception of the Blessed Virgin Mary. (No. 3) A change in the election of bishops in introduced. (No. 5) Bishops are not to give an exeat at the request of a priest unless it be certain that another bishop will receive him. (No. 6) Priests are forbidden to assist at the marriages of those who have already had a ceremony performed by a Protestant minister, or who intend to have such ceremony performed. 

(No. 7) A national council should be held in Baltimore in 1850, by Apostolic Authority. The fathers moreover petitioned the Holy See to raise the New Orleans, Cincinnati and New York City dioceses to Metropolitan dignity and to make a new limitation of the Provinces of Baltimore and St. Louis. They desired likewise that Baltimore should be declared the primatial see of the Republic. The pope granted the first part of the petition, but deferred acting on the question of primacy.

Eighth Provincial Council
The Eighth Council was assembled in 1855. The archbishop and seven bishops or their representatives attended it. This council enacted: (No. 1) The fathers joyfully receive the dogmatic decision of the pope defining the Immaculate Conception of the Blessed Virgin Mary. (No. 2) Priests are warned that after August, 1857, adults must be baptized according to the regular formula for that service in the Roman Ritual and not according to that for infant baptism. (No. 4) No tax is to be demanded for dispensations from matrimonial impediments. 

(No. 6) Bishops are exhorted to increase the number of their diocesan consultors to ten or twelve, but it will not be necessary to obtain the opinion of all of them, even on important matters, the counsel of three or four will suffice. On the death of the bishop, all the consultors shall send to the archbishop their written opinions as to an eligible successor for the vacant see. (No. 7) The various diocesan synods should determine on the best mode of providing for the proper support of the bishop. (No. 8) The fathers desire to see an American College erected in Rome. To the Acts of this council is appended a decree of the Holy See, sanctioning a mode of procedure in judicial causes of clerics.

Ninth Provincial Council
The Ninth Council in 1858 was attended by the archbishop and seven bishops. The main work of this synod consisted in drawing up petitions to the Holy See concerning a dispensation from abstinence on Saturdays; the conceding of certain honorary privileges to the Archbishop of Baltimore; the granting to the bishops the permission to allow the Blessed Sacrament to be kept in chapels of religious communities not subject to the law of enclosure. All of these petitions were granted by the Holy See. 

That concerning the Archbishop of Baltimore granted to him, as ruler of the mother-church of the United States, an honorary pre-eminence, to consist in his taking precedence of any other archbishop in the country, without regard to promotion or consecration, and in his having the place of honour in all councils and conventions. The fathers also sent to Rome an inquiry as to the nature of the vows (solemn or simple) of religious women, especially of Visitation Nuns in the United States, an answer to which was deferred to a later time (1864). 

The question was also discussed whether Archbishop Kenrick's version of the Bible should be approved for general use. It was finally decided to wait for Dr John Henry Newman's expected version, and then to determine along with the bishops of other English-speaking countries on one common version.

Tenth Provincial Council
In 1869, the Tenth Council enacted decrees that were signed by the archbishop, twelve bishops and one abbot. These decrees included: 
(No. 5) Bishops are exhorted to establish missions and schools for the Negroes (African Americans) of their dioceses. The Council Fathers were to provide missions and schools for all Black Americans in their dioceses, as education was seen as a critical need by the community.
(No. 7) Priests are to be appointed to aid the bishops in administering the temporal concerns of the diocese. They are also to supervise the spiritual and material affairs of religious women. At the request of the fathers, the Holy See extended for five years the privilege of using the short formula in the baptism of adults. 

It should be remarked that the first seven provincial councils of Baltimore were practically, though not formally, plenary councils of the United States.

See also
Plenary Councils of Baltimore

References

Baltimore, Plenary Councils of
19th-century Catholic Church councils
1829 in the United States
1837 in the United States
1840 in the United States
1829 in Christianity
1837 in Christianity
1840 in Christianity
1829 conferences
1837 conferences
1840 conferences
1843 in the United States
1846 in Maryland
1849 in Maryland
1843 in Christianity
1846 in Christianity
1849 in Christianity
1843 conferences
1846 conferences
1849 conferences
1855 in the United States
1858 in the United States
1869 in the United States
1855 in Christianity
1858 in Christianity
1869 in Christianity
1855 conferences
1858 conferences
1869 conferences